Atienza is a municipality located in the province of Guadalajara, Spain. According to the 2006 census (INE), the municipality had a population of 437 inhabitants.

The Castle of Atienza is situated here.  

There were ancient Celtiberian settlements in the Cerro del Padrastro.

Geology 
Atienza, as well as the area surrounding it, is located in the transition zone between the Sistema Ibérico and the Sistema Central.

Gallery

Notable people
Juan Bravo was born in Atienza.

Luisa de Medrano was born in Atienza. (August 9th, 1484)

Bonifacio Escudero, worked as a doctor, has a street to his name.

References

External links 

 Ayuntamiento de Atienza
 Villa de Atienza

Municipalities in the Province of Guadalajara